Nevskaya Pipeline Company LLC is an oil terminal company operating in Ust-Luga Port, Russia. It was originally controlled by Gunvor; however, as of 2015 it was owned by Gazprombank (74%) and Transneft (26%).
. Its terminal with a capacity of 30 million tonnes per year is the end point of the Baltic Pipeline System-II.

References

External links
Company official website (English)

Leningrad Oblast
Oil terminals